Legio IV Scythica ("Scythian Fourth Legion"), also written as Legio IIII Scythica, was a legion of the Imperial Roman army founded in  by the Roman general Mark Antony, for his campaign against the Parthian Empire, hence its other cognomen, Parthica. The legion was still active in the Roman province of Syria in the early 5th century.

Origins and service during the Roman Republic

The Legio IV Scythica was founded by the Roman general Mark Antony after 42 BCE. It is unknown where the legion was first stationed, although Syria is a possibility. If that is the case, the legion most likely took part in Mark Antony's campaign against the Parthians. The name Scythica implies that it fought the Scythians. The Scythians were a group of nomadic tribes located near a Roman city named Olbia. The Scythians also occasionally tried to cross the Danube. This makes it very likely the Legion defeated one of the Scythian tribes in a battle.

Service under the Roman Empire

After the Battle of Actium (31 BCE) and Mark Antony's suicide, Octavian transferred the Legio IV Scythica to the Roman province of Moesia, in the Danube area. The legion is reported to have taken part in civilian tasks, such as the building and keeping of roads. In his youth, future Roman Emperor Vespasian served in this legion. The legion's base was probably at Viminacium.

Tiberius's war against Illyria
Between 6 and 9 CE, the IV Scythica took part in Tiberius' wars against the Illyrians and Pannonians. The legion also constructed roads and other works of engineering in the Danube area.

Roman–Parthian War of 58–63
King Vologases I of Parthia invaded Armenia, a client kingdom of Rome, in 58 CE, beginning the war against the Parthians (58–63 CE). Nero ordered Gnaeus Domitius Corbulo, the new legate of Cappadocia, to manage the matter. Corbulo brought the Legio IIII Scythica from Moesia, and with the legions III Gallica and VI Ferrata they defeated the Parthians, restoring Tigranes VI to the Armenian throne. In 62 CE, IIII Scythica and XII Fulminata, commanded by the new legate of Cappadocia, Lucius Caesennius Paetus, were defeated by the Parthians at the Battle of Rhandeia and forced to surrender. The legions were covered with shame and withdrawn from the war theatre to Zeugma. This city would be the base camp of IIII Scythica for the next century.

Year of the Four Emperors
In the Year of the Four Emperors, in 69 CE, the IV Scythica, alongside the rest of the Eastern legions, sided with Vespasian immediately. Despite the demonstrated loyalty, IV Scythica was not involved in actual fighting because it was not considered a high-quality legion. This was a consequence of an earlier defeat in the First Jewish–Roman War (66–73 CE). In 70 CE, the legion was used to stop a pogrom against the Jewish population of Antioch. The legion would also build a canal in Seleucia Pieria.

Roman–Parthian Wars and Roman–Sassanid Wars 
The IV Scythica took part in the Parthian campaign of Trajan, As well as the war against the Parthians (161–166 CE). Between 181 and 183 CE, Septimius Severus acted as the commander of the Eastern legions, and he later relied on the power of said legions to become the next Roman Emperor. The legion's former commander, now Emperor, Semptimus Severus would lead another campaign against the Parthians. This campaign also used the IV Scythica. The legion was most likely involved in the eastern campaign of Caracalla in 219 CE.

Revolt and disappearance
The legion disappeared from Roman historiographical sources after 219 CE, when their commander, Gellius Maximus, rebelled against Emperor Elagabalus and proclaimed himself Emperor, but was defeated. However, according to Notitia Dignitatum (XXXIII), in the early 3rd century, the IV Scythica was still active in Roman Syria, camped in Orese. It is possible this legion participated in the campaigns of Severus Alexander and Odaenathus against the Sassanids.

Attested members

Epigraphic testimonies

Unit symbol
The legion's symbol was a capricorn.

In popular culture
The legion appeared in Harry Sidebottom's series of historical novels Warrior of Rome.

See also
List of Roman legions
Siege of Dura-Europos (256)

References

External links
livius.org account of Legio IV Scythica

1st-century BC establishments in the Roman Republic
210s disestablishments in the Roman Empire
219 disestablishments
40s BC establishments
First Jewish–Roman War
Military units and formations established in the 1st century BC
Moesia
04 Scythica
Roman–Parthian Wars
Roman–Sasanian Wars
Roman Syria
Year of the Four Emperors